George Bernard Barnicle (August 26, 1917 – October 10, 1990) was a Major League Baseball pitcher. He played three seasons with the Boston Bees / Braves from 1939 to 1941.

References

External links

Boston Braves players
Major League Baseball pitchers
1917 births
1990 deaths
Baseball players from Massachusetts
Beaver Falls Bees players
Zanesville Greys players
Hartford Laurels players
Syracuse Chiefs players
Hartford Bees players
Sportspeople from Fitchburg, Massachusetts